Passion for People (Italian:Passione di popolo) is a 1921 Italian silent film directed by Giuseppe Sterni.

Cast
 Alex Bernard 
 Carmen Boni
 Annunziata Pasquali 
 Giuseppe Sterni 
 Cecyl Tryan 
 Michele Ugazzi

References

Bibliography
 Stewart, John. Italian film: a who's who. McFarland, 1994.

External links

1921 films
1920s Italian-language films
Italian silent films
Italian black-and-white films